Inge Sørensen (18 July 1924 – 9 March 2011), later Inge Tabur, sometimes known as "Lille henrivende Inge" ("Little Lovely Inge") was a Danish swimmer, who at age 12 won a bronze medal in 200 meter breaststroke at the 1936 Summer Olympics in Berlin. This makes her the youngest Olympic medal winner in an individual competition.

During 1936-1944 she won nine Danish championships, two Nordic championships and one European championship. She set 14 Danish records in breaststroke. She also broke the world record on 400 m and 500 m breaststroke and became the first Danish female swimmer under 3 minutes on 200 m breaststroke.

Her swimming career was cut short by World War II. After the war she married a Danish engineer and moved abroad eventually residing in USA.

Early life

Inge Sørensen was born in Skovshoved, Denmark, the daughter of a fishmonger in 1924. She began swimming at age 3 in the harbor of Skovshoved north of Copenhagen and won her first Danish championship age 11 in 1936 on 200 m breaststroke.
Because of this she was selected for the Olympic Games in Berlin the same year.

Olympic Games in Berlin 1936

At the Olympic Games at age 12 she won a bronze medal on 200 m breaststroke. She is the youngest medal-winner at the Olympic Games in an individual competition. Her final on August 11 was the first event to be broadcast live on air by Danish radio, which itself was a sensation. During the games she got the nickname Lille henrivende Inge (Little Lovely Inge).

On return from Berlin she and the other Danish female medal-winner, Ragnhild Hveger, received a chaotic welcome in Copenhagen.

European Championships in London 1938
Between 1936 and 1938 Inge Sørensen improved her times in swimming though it was feared that puberty would slow her down. At the European championships in swimming in London 1938 she won a gold medal in 200 m breaststroke.

She was not the only Danish woman with success because Denmark became best nation for female swimmers.

World War II
The period 1939-1941 was the height of her career. In 1939 she broke the world record on 400 m and 500 m breaststroke and in 1941 she became the first Danish female swimmer under 3 minutes on 200 m breaststroke.

Nevertheless, World War II meant that the Summer Olympics in 1940 and 1944 were cancelled together with the European Championships in 1942. This made her end her swimming career in 1944.

Unlike other Danish swimmers, such as Ragnhild Hveger, she did not go to Germany for international competition during the war.

Later life
Inge Sørensen took an education in instructing and coaching in 1946 and afterwards taught gymnastics and swimming. After being married in 1948 to Danish engineer Janus Tabur, she followed him to South Africa and later Canada and from 1951 United States. She lived in New Jersey until her death in 2011.

Notes

References

Bibliography 

1924 births
2011 deaths
Danish female swimmers
Female breaststroke swimmers
Olympic bronze medalists for Denmark
Olympic swimmers of Denmark
Olympic bronze medalists in swimming
People from Mount Laurel, New Jersey
People from Gentofte Municipality
European Aquatics Championships medalists in swimming
Medalists at the 1936 Summer Olympics
Swimmers at the 1936 Summer Olympics
Sportspeople from the Capital Region of Denmark